Brandon Gaudin (born December 18, 1983) is an American television broadcaster for Bally Sports South and Bally Sports Southeast's coverage of the Atlanta Braves baseball. He also does play-by-play for college football  and college basketball for Fox Sports and the Big Ten Network. 

Additionally, he calls the Men's NCAA basketball tournament and select NFL games on Westwood One.  He was previously the voice of Georgia Tech football and men's basketball, as well as Butler men's basketball. He has also called various NCAA championships for Turner Sports and select ACC baseball and basketball games on ESPN3. He is also the voice of Madden NFL for EA Sports (2017-present).

Early life
Gaudin was born and raised in Evansville, Indiana. He was an Atlanta Braves fan and wrote a letter to Skip Caray asking how to get into sports broadcasting. Caray responded and encouraged him to practice, critique, and practice some more. Gaudin kept those words in his heart, and in high school convinced a local radio station to allow him to broadcast some of his school's baseball games.

After graduation from Harrison High School, Gaudin enrolled at Butler University where he would graduate with a communications degree with an emphasis in broadcasting. He also majored in Political Science and received a minor in Business. He was named a "Top 10 Male Student" at Butler and given the distinction of the "Most Outstanding Communications Student" in his class.

Career
Gaudin's first post-college job was broadcasting Minor League baseball for the Orem Owlz, an affiliate of the Los Angeles Angels.

After one season with Orem, Gaudin took an on-air hiatus to assist in the formation of a New York City start-up with two former bosses at ESPN, where he interned during college. Gaudin, along with Erik Sorenson, the former President of MSNBC, and former Larry King Live Producer Robert Grossman founded MediaOne Management in 2007. The boutique firm specializes in the representation of cable news talking heads.

Gaudin left New York in the fall of 2008 for the opportunity to get back on air in his hometown of Evansville, Indiana as the Voice of the Evansville Purple Aces.  He also served as a freelance on-air talent for the local ABC affiliate.

From there, Gaudin returned to Butler, serving three years as the Voice of the Butler Bulldogs. He was hired on the heels of Butler's 2010 run to the National Championship game where they fell to Duke; however, he was on the mic the following season when Butler returned to the Final Four in 2011.  During his time at Butler, the Indianapolis Star called Gaudin "a rising star in the industry". While in Indianapolis, he also began freelance play-by-play work for Turner Sports via their partnership with the NCAA, broadcasting various collegiate championships.

In 2013, Gaudin was hired to be the voice of the Georgia Tech Yellow Jackets. His predecessor, Wes Durham, had moved on to call SEC and ACC games for FSN. Gaudin won the job from a long list of over 150 nationwide candidates. Gaudin's hiring was featured in The New York Times where a Vice President for rights-holder IMG noted "Gaudin's vocal stylings jumped off the page." Gaudin would call his first game for the Yellow Jackets on August 31, 2013. During his time at Tech, Gaudin was hired by Westwood One as a play-by-play broadcaster for their men's basketball NCAA Tournament and college football coverage.

In June 2016, it was announced that Gaudin would replace Jim Nantz as the Play-by-Play Voice of the Madden NFL video game for EA Sports. In releasing the news, EA Producer Christian McLeod said "What really attracted us to Brandon was he just sounds like sports." Previous announcers for the game besides Nantz have included Pat Summerall, Al Michaels, John Madden, Cris Collinsworth, Tom Hammond, Gus Johnson and Phil Simms.

Also in June 2016, Gaudin was signed by the Big Ten Network to broadcast football, basketball and baseball in addition to expanding his role in college and the NFL as a play-by-play voice for Westwood One. Gaudin’s also broadcasts select NFL, college football, college basketball, and Major League Baseball games for Fox Sports.

Several of Gaudin's calls have been featured on ESPN's SportsCenter Play of the Day as well as The Dan Patrick Show. One of the springboards to Gaudin's career came during his junior year in college, when he won a nationwide Play-by-Play competition sponsored by CBS during the 2005 NCAA Tournament. For winning the award, Gaudin was flown to the Final Four and interviewed at halftime on CBS by Greg Gumbel.

On February 16, 2023, Bally Sports South and Southeast announced that Gaudin was the new play-by-play broadcaster for the Atlanta Braves, replacing Chip Caray who left to do play-by-play for the St. Louis Cardinals. Gaudin said "I get to be behind the mic for the team I grew up idolizing. And the team who fostered my love for both sports and broadcasting."

References 

1983 births
Living people
American radio sports announcers
American television sports announcers
Butler University alumni
College baseball announcers in the United States
College basketball announcers in the United States
College football announcers
Detroit Lions announcers
Georgia Tech Yellow Jackets football announcers
Georgia Tech Yellow Jackets men's basketball announcers
Major League Baseball broadcasters
Minor League Baseball broadcasters
National Football League announcers
Sportspeople from Evansville, Indiana
Women's college basketball announcers in the United States